Tytroca metaxantha is a moth of the family Erebidae first described by George Hampson in 1902. It is found in South Africa and Zimbabwe.

External links

Catocalinae
Moths described in 1902
Taxa named by George Hampson